Dark Crimes (originally released in film festivals before 2018 as True Crimes) is a 2016 crime drama film directed by Alexandros Avranas and written by Jeremy Brock. The film was based on a 2008 article in The New Yorker by David Grann titled "True Crime: A Postmodern Murder Mystery", which was an inspiration for the first movie title. The film stars Jim Carrey in the lead role, Agata Kulesza, Charlotte Gainsbourg, Kati Outinen, Zbigniew Zamachowski, and Marton Csokas, and follows a detective who notices similarities between a cold case murder and a best-selling novel.

Producer Brett Ratner had True Crimes in development since 2010. Principal photography began on 12 November 2015 in Kraków, Poland and ended on 13 December 2015. It held its premiere at the Warsaw Film Festival on 12 October 2016, and had a limited theatrical release in only a few countries, such as the United States, in 2018. The Lionsgate Films home entertainment division, Lionsgate Unlocked, released Dark Crimes on Blu-ray and DVD on 31 July 2018. On 21 May 2018, the company revealed a new trailer for the film to promote this home video release.

Despite some praise for the cast, critics panned Dark Crimes for its pacing, overly downcast tone, and objectionable presentation of abused women. It is one of the worst-reviewed films of 2018, holding a 0% approval rating on Rotten Tomatoes.

Synopsis 
Tadek is a detective who takes on a case involving the murder of a businessman. To his and everyone's surprise the case is identical to a character's murder in a recently published novel by a man named Kozlov. While the crime appears to be an open and shut case, Tadek discovers a darker secret.

Cast 
 Jim Carrey as Tadek
 Marton Csokas as Kozlov
 Charlotte Gainsbourg as Kasia
 Agata Kulesza as Marta
 Kati Outinen as Malinowska
 Zbigniew Zamachowski as Lukasz
 Danuta Kowalska as Kozlov's Mother

Development 
An article from The Hollywood Reporter published on 29 September 2010 revealed Brett Ratner's company RatPac Entertainment was developing a film named True Crimes with Focus Features. On 7 April 2011, Deadline Hollywood reported that the script was written by Jeremy Brock, and Roman Polanski was "circling" the project. On 7 June 2013, The Hollywood Reporter revealed Focus Features dropped out in 2012, and Christoph Waltz would play Jacek Wroblewski. On 14 May 2015, TheWrap announced that Waltz was replaced with Jim Carrey for Wroblewski and that Miss Violence (2013) director Alexandros Avranas would direct True Crimes; David Gerson, Ewa Puszczynska, and Michael Aguilar were also revealed to be producers. Page Six announced on 21 October 2015 that Charlotte Gainsbourg was "in talks" to be in True Crimes.

Production 
Principal photography on the film began on 12 November 2015 in Kraków, Poland, wrapping up on 13 December 2015. After filming completed, Carrey kept the beard he grew for his role while presenting the 73rd Golden Globe Awards, while garnered several Twitter reaction posts. Although the filming location and most of the crew of True Crimes was Polish, the film was an international production due to its actors coming from various countries, such as Canada (Carrey), Britain (Gainsbourg), Romania (Ivanov), and Finland (Outinen); and some of its producers being American and Canadian. Due to the Poland setting of the subject of the New Yorker story, producers David Gerson and Kasia Nabiałczyk contacted the biggest figure of the film industry in Poland, Opus Film, to help on True Crimes; the company was most known for Ida (2015), a film that, only months before True Crimes began principal photography, won an Academy Award.

According to Culture.pl, this plus the cast and crew of the film coming from various countries indicated a re-interest in Polish cinema worldwide. Polish film journalist Darek Kuźma, writing a feature upon True Crimes' 2016 premiere at Warsaw, reported "opportunities in the rapidly developing Polish film industry, with its quality casts and crews, its variety of locations that can stand in for almost every part of the world, and its growing number of regional film commmissions." The Polish Film Institute contributed €446,000 to True Crimes' €4 million budget. Explained Ewa Puszczyńska, who attached the Polish Film Institute as well as the Kraków Film Commission for financing, "We’ve made a film with American producers, and international stars, for a fraction of what it would have cost in the US or Western Europe."

Release 
The first stills of True Crimes were released on 27 November 2015. The film had its world premiere at the Warsaw Film Festival on 12 October 2016, under the name True Crimes. Saban Films picked up the distribution rights for North America on 4 April 2017. On 25 January 2018, Jim Carrey announced that the film's title had been changed to Dark Crimes and that the North American theatrical release would likely occur in April. Myrkur's song "Skøgen Skulle Dø" was used in the trailer. The U.S. theatrical release was later announced as 18 May 2018, with an earlier DirecTV exclusive release on 19 April. Internationally, Dark Crimes only ran for one week in Colombia, Italy, and Hungary; and only for a week longer in Portugal.

Dark Crimes was released to Blu-ray in Canada on 17 July 2018, the United States on 31 July 2018, Sweden on 30 January 2019, Italy on 7 February 2019, France on 2 May 2019, and Germany on 14 June 2019. Dark Crimes also garnered DVD releases in the United States, issued on 31 July 2018; and Taiwan, on 28 June 2019. Wal-mart exclusively sold versions of the Blu-ray that were also packed with a DVD.

Critical response 
Before the release of True Crimes, sources such as The Playlist and The Independent were excited for the project due to the involvements of Avranas, Gainsbourg, and Kulesza; but were a bit skeptical due to Carrey's previous involvement in a dark thriller, The Number 23 (2007), which had an underwhelming reception. Marshall Lemon, responding to the November 2015 still revelations, wrote Carrey "absolutely looks the part," and "the visual style is also reminiscent of shows like True Detective which transformed actors like Woody Harrelson and Matthew McConaughey into surprising dramatic presences. If True Crimes can do the same for Carrey, it might just be worth keeping an eye on."

On Rotten Tomatoes, the film has an approval rating of 0%, based on reviews from 37 critics, with an average rating of 2.8/10. The website's critical consensus reads, "Dark Crimes is a rote, unpleasant thriller that fails to parlay its compelling true story and a committed Jim Carrey performance into even modest chills." Metacritic, which assigned a normalized rating average score of 24 out of 100 based on 14 critics, and their editorial stated "this Polish-set but English-language entry stars a bearded, accented, against-type (and, apparently, against-ability) Jim Carrey in a bleak, violent crime thriller described by critics as "misogynistic," "depressing," "ugly," and "abysmal."" It was the eighth lowest-ranking 2018 film on the site.

Reviews targeted the film's overly "gloomy and unexciting" tone, and noted that ruined the film's potential plot; and the pacing's slow and excessively-tense build, which Owen Gleiberman of Variety found especially a problem with details of the mystery being "all far too obvious." The New York Times called the last act its best part simply for having far more action than the previous sequences. The A.V. Club summarized that the film replaced the "source material’s appealing elements and characterizations with overcomplicated thriller clichés and humorless prurience," and IGN critic Witney Seibold criticized its predictable plot, as "it can be seen in just about every episode of Law & Order: Criminal Intent." The film's exploitative scenes involving physical and sexual abuse towards women also turned several critics off, one critic from Slant Magazine describing them as "blatantly misogynistic."

The film's technical aspects were divisively received. The A.V. Club summarized the directing as "leaden and one-note in its attempt to imitate the bleakness of Swedish and Norwegian crime imports in an indifferent Eastern European setting; the sky is always overcast and the characters are all dressed like they’re on their way to a funeral." The New York Observer panned the "ugly, sterile sets" and poor photography; SF Weekly called the shot compositions gimmicky; while Oktay Kozak Ege opined the "aesthetically repetitive" visuals made tension sequences more unbearable to watch. However, Consequence of Sound writer Randall Colburn stated "Avranas' muted, sterile style pops with a few flourishes, mainly in his knack for cultivating a truly unsettling aura around the starkness of the film’s depravity." He also praised the use of POV shots for "creating a curious sense of alienation, as if one is both inside the film but outside of its truth, looking in at the larger reality." Luke W. Thompson of Forbes applauded the editing and directing for matching the mood of the story, and David Lewis of the San Francisco Chronicle honored its "impressive" production design.

Opinions towards Carrey's performance ranged from positive and the film's only redeeming factor to his worst-ever dramatic performance. In addition to several criticisms towards his fake Polish accent, Gleiberman wrote that "Carrey broods and stares like an actor who’s out to muffle any hint of his natural spirit by swathing it in poker-faced gloom," and the New York Post summarized Carrey as "so muted and sedate [...] he blends into the background. That’s not easy to do when most of his scenes involve no more than two people." The character of Tadek was also criticized as "underwritten" to the point of being "an ordinary person doing his ordinary job [...] even if the circumstances are extraordinary." Colburn explained, "Tadek is a character written to be devoid of charm or humor and, as such, Carrey has no opportunities to draw upon the anxious, springy energy of Man on the Moon or the desperate, aching despair of Eternal Sunshine." IGN wrote the character was too "empty" for someone supposedly obsessed with the case he was solving.

The supporting actors, such as Csokas, Outinen, Ivanov, and Gainsbourg were positively commented on; some critics found Csokas to be the film's best actor, Thompson explaining that he "strikes the right balance of legitimate rage and pretentious self-importance that you could imagine youngsters embracing." However, Colburn felt that Csokas' "icky vein of cruelty", Gainsbourg's "compelling bloodletting", and Wieckiewicz's "pulp paperback" style contradicted the tone of Carrey's performance, resulting in "imbalance that serves to sink the film."

References

External links 
 
 

2016 films
2016 crime drama films
2016 crime thriller films
American crime drama films
American crime thriller films
American police detective films
Crime films based on actual events
English-language Polish films
Polish crime drama films
Polish crime thriller films
Films based on newspaper and magazine articles
Films set in Kraków
Films set in Poland
Films shot in Kraków
Thriller films based on actual events
2010s English-language films
2010s American films
English-language crime drama films